Mahour Jabbari (born May 10, 2000) is an Iranian actress. She is most noted for her performance in the 2017 film Ava, for which she received a Canadian Screen Award nomination for Best Actress at the 6th Canadian Screen Awards.

Her name was among the best 11 female performances from films released within the first six months of 2018.

References

External links

Iranian film actresses
Living people
2000 births